The name Teichberg means ‘mountain stream’ in Austrian.

Notable Teichberg’s:
 Elliot Tiber (1935–2016), previously named Eliyahu Teichberg, was an artist, gay rights activist, screenplay writer and interior designer best known as a businessman who helped enable the staging of the landmark 1969 Woodstock music festival.
 Ignatius Teichberg (1923-2006), was a stock broker, investment analyst, and financial columnist known as Igo. He ran a firm named after him and "Teichberg's Market Strategy, was his newsletter that specialized in scouting takeover targets.
 Teichberg (269m/883ft) is a hill in Austria. The prominence is 4m/13ft. Its location is 48.55887 N  15.937386 E in Lower Austria (Bezirk Hollabrunn).
 Vivian Teichberg (1945-2011), was a Belgian professor of neurobiology & a research scientist at the Weizmann Institute in Israel. He was among the first to isolate and study a receptor protein to which Glutamate binds in the brain, and to solve Glutamate receptor’s primary structure—a seminal finding that contributed to the explosion of knowledge on the role of Glutamate receptors in brain physiology and pathology.
 Mirta Teichberg is a marine ecologist with a focus on coastal benthic community ecology and ecophysiology at the Leibniz Centre for Tropical Marine Research in Germany.
 Rachel Teichberg, Miami-based consultant and speaker in the field of veterinary management, a certified mediator & trainer, and an emotional intelligence trainer.